The World 240 Invitational Superstock Championship is an annually hosted championship held at Paradise Valley Speedway in Rotorua, New Zealand. Contested with drivers often from the United Kingdom, Netherlands, America and New Zealand the championship winner shall be invited to compete in the BriSCA Formula 1 Stock Cars World Championship along with the winner of the New Zealand Superstock Championship in a fully funded campaign. The current champion is Keegan Levien contracted to Wellington Speedway who won his title on the 25th of January 2020.

The titles is unique to other superstocks racing championships with the 240s event allowing for a number of drivers to become pre-qualified to the finals field of 26 drivers. This makes the 240 championship one of the most difficult titles to master, as spots within the finals field became scarce with 5 international drivers being automatically seeded to the finals together with the defending 240s champion and with the winner of the second tier championship held on finals night. Held over just 3 races of 15 laps, the need for the best possible points result is a must with even 1 DNF making it nearly impossible to win the title.

Engines
Current Speedway New Zealand rules stipulate the engine must be no larger the 248 cubic inches, with teams using small block V8 race engines. The estimated power output figure is around 500hp. 
Most cars tend to run:
 Toyota VVTI V8
 Nissan VK56 V8
 Nissan VH41 V8
 Ford V8
 Chevrolet V8
 Jaguar Cars V8

Past champions 
The following is a list of past champions of the event:

The following is a list of the "most wins" in the event:

References

Superstock racing
Superstock